Elliot's pheasant (Syrmaticus ellioti), is a large pheasant native to south-eastern China.

Description

Distribution
Its diet consists mainly of seeds, leaves and berries.

Taxonomy
Elliot's pheasant was first described in 1872 by Robert Swinhoe, under the name "Phasianus ellioti"; the type material was from Ningpo, Zhejiang province, China. The specific epithet  commemorates the American ornithologist Daniel Giraud Elliot; Swinhoe explained his choice thus:
"Possessed of so many striking characteristics, it would be easy to find an appropriate name for so marked a species; but on glancing down the list of Pheasants I find that not one bears the name of Elliot; and it strikes me it would be wrong to allow his magnificent work on the subject to close without the figure of a bird dedicated to himself" Alternative common names for the species include Chinese bar-backed pheasant and Chinese barred-backed pheasant.

Conservation
Although there is ongoing habitat loss, and the species has a limited range and is hunted for food, Elliot's pheasant is evaluated as near threatened on the IUCN Red List of Threatened Species, as it does not appear to be declining appreciably in numbers. It is listed on Appendix I of CITES.

See also
List of endangered and protected species of China

References

External links 

 Elliot's Pheasant, gbwf.ord

Elliot's pheasant
Birds of South China
Endemic birds of China
Elliot's pheasant